"Come Back When You Grow Up" is a song written by Martha Sharp and performed by Bobby Vee and The Strangers.   It appeared on his 1967 album, Come Back When You Grow Up, was produced by Dallas Smith and arranged by William Hood.

Background
A slightly longer version from the album features a brief instrumental introduction before Vee comes in, while on the single version, the song begins with Vee's vocals.

Chart performance
"Come Back When You Grow Up" was a comeback for the 24 year-old Vee, and it reached No.3 on the Billboard Hot 100 in 1967.  It was ranked No.15 on Billboard magazine's Top Hot 100 songs of 1967.

Other versions
Johnny Tillotson's recording was included on his 1967 album "Here I am".
Los Freddy's released his take entitled "Cuando Seas Mujer" on their 1968, Mató Mi Corazon.
Leif Garrett put out a single in 1977, which did not chart.

References

1967 songs
1967 singles
Bobby Vee songs
1976 debut singles
Leif Garrett songs
Liberty Records singles
20th Century Fox Records singles